Novak Djokovic defeated Kevin Anderson in the final, 6–2, 6–2, 7–6(7–3) to win the gentlemen's singles tennis title at the 2018 Wimbledon Championships. It was his fourth Wimbledon title and 13th major title overall, passing Roy Emerson to outright fourth place on the all time men's singles major wins list. The win was also Djokovic's first title in over 12 months, his previous win having been at Eastbourne on July 1, 2017, and returned him to the top 10 in rankings. The Men's Singles competition was contested by all but one of the top 20 male players in the ATP as of 25 June 2018.

Roger Federer was the defending champion and top seed, but lost in the quarterfinals to Anderson despite leading by two sets to love and having a match point in the third set. Rafael Nadal and Federer were in contention for the world No. 1 ranking; Nadal retained the top ranking by reaching the fourth round.

Stan Wawrinka was attempting to complete the career Grand Slam but lost to qualifier Thomas Fabbiano in the second round.

Progress of the competition
Roger Federer was the defending champion and top seed. Federer and Rafael Nadal were in contention for the ATP No. 1 ranking at the start of the tournament. Former champion and local favourite Andy Murray announced on the day before the tournament began that he was pulling out because he was not fully recovered from hip surgery. His place was taken by "lucky loser" Jason Jung.

2017 finalist and no. 3 seed Marin Čilić went out in the second round of the tournament, defeated by Guido Pella of Argentina. Čilić had been two sets up when rain stopped play, but had difficulty coping with the conditions after play was resumed, and complained to the umpire about the state of the grass. The following morning, when they returned to continue the match, Pella won in five sets.

Feliciano López made his 66th consecutive Grand Slam main draw appearance, surpassing the previous record of 65 consecutive appearances he jointly held with Federer. López was defeated in the second round by no 5 seed Juan Martín del Potro.

Nadal retained his top ranking by reaching the semifinal. Federer lost in the quarterfinals to Kevin Anderson despite leading by two sets to love and having a match point in the third set. The semifinal match between Anderson and John Isner, lasting 6 hours 36 minutes, was the second longest men's singles match at Wimbledon and the third longest men's singles match in tennis history. Isner has thus played in the two longest matches in Wimbledon history (the other one being the record-holding 2010 match against Nicolas Mahut). The 2018 semifinals were the longest two semifinals in Wimbledon history.

Anderson became the first man representing South Africa to reach the Wimbledon men's singles final since Brian Norton in 1921 (South African-born Kevin Curren represented the United States when he was a finalist in 1985). Anderson held a total of five set points in the third set of the championship match, but was unable to force a fourth set.

Seeds
All seedings per modified ATP rankings.

Qualifying

Draw

Finals

Top half

Section 1

Section 2

Section 3

Section 4

Bottom half

Section 5

Section 6

Section 7

Section 8

References

External links 
 Men's singles draw
 2018 Wimbledon Championships – Men's draws and results at the International Tennis Federation

Men's Singles
Wimbledon Championship by year – Men's singles
Wimbledon Championships - Men's singles